The 2017 Lehigh Mountain Hawks football team represented Lehigh University in the 2017 NCAA Division I FCS football season. The Mountain Hawks were led by 12th-year head coach Andy Coen and played their home games at Goodman Stadium. They were a member of the Patriot League. They finished the season 5–7, 5–1 in Patriot League play to finish in a tie for the Patriot League championship with Colgate. Due to their head-to-head win over Colgate, Lehigh received the Patriot League's automatic bid to the FCS Playoffs where they lost to Stony Brook in the first round.

Schedule
The 2017 schedule consists of six home and five away games. The Mountain Hawks will host Patriot League foes Georgetown, Holy Cross, and Lafayette for the 153rd meeting of The Rivalry, and will travel to Colgate, Fordham, and Bucknell.

In 2017, Lehigh's non-conference opponents will be Villanova of the Colonial Athletic Association, Monmouth of the Big South Conference, Yale and Penn of the Ivy League, and Wagner of the Northeast Conference.

Game summaries

Villanova

at Monmouth

Yale

Penn

at Wagner

at Colgate

Georgetown

at Fordham

at Bucknell

Holy Cross

Lafayette

FCS Playoffs

at Stony Brook–First Round

Ranking movements

References

Lehigh
Lehigh Mountain Hawks football seasons
Patriot League football champion seasons
Lehigh
Lehigh Mountain Hawks football